Calling Down the Sky (2004) is an album by the American ambient musician Robert Rich. The material on this album was recorded live in Denver, Colorado on July 26, 2003, performed to an audience of 26.

Rich's inspiration for the album came from his experiences of extreme weather while on a 2003 tour of the United States, in which he experienced tornadoes, floods, and sandstorms. The music on this album is slow and textural, with ominous overtones.

Track listing
”Erasing Traces” – 13:17
”Overhead” – 5:34
”Vertigo” – 21:34
”Supplication” – 7:23
”Borealis” – 6:01
”Lost Landmarks” – 6:25
”Adrift” – 4:56
”Recognition” – 8:50

External links
album feature from Robert Rich’s official web site

Robert Rich (musician) albums
2003 live albums